The Ward Museum of Wildfowl Art is located at 909 South Schumaker Drive, Salisbury, Maryland, United States.  This museum has the most comprehensive collection of wildfowl carvings in the world, ranging from art sculptures to working decoys used by hunters.  The museum was named after Lem and Steve Ward from Crisfield, Maryland, two pioneers who moved decoy carvings into the realm of fine art.

The museum includes:
Welcome Theatre
Decoy In Time
Habitat Theatre
Art Lamay Gallery
Decoy Study Gallery
The Ward Brothers’ Workshop
Championship Gallery.

Footnotes

External links
Ward Museum of Wildfowl Art (official website)

Buildings and structures in Salisbury, Maryland
Woodcarving
Museums in Wicomico County, Maryland
Folk art museums and galleries in Maryland
Art museums established in 1975
1975 establishments in Maryland